Dhruva (ruled 780–793 CE) was one of the most notable rulers of the Rashtrakuta Empire. He ascended the throne after replacing his elder brother Govinda II. Govinda II had become unpopular among his subjects on account of his various misconducts as a ruler, including excessive indulgence in sensual pleasures. This according to the historian Kamath is evident from the Karhad plates of Krishna III. The Dhulia grant of 779 and Garugadahalli inscription of 782 proclaim Dhruva the emperor. Though some historians claim that Dhruva revolted and grabbed the throne, other  historians feel the transition of the throne from Govinda II to Dhruva was peaceful and may have happened willingly. He earned titles like Kalivallabha, Srivallabha, Dharavarsha, Maharajadhiraja and Parameshvara.

Success in north and east

Dhruva Dharavarsha had a high political aspiration and he actively pursued the goal of expanding the frontiers of Rashtrakuta domination. In North India, he subjugated the rulers of Kannauj. In central India, he defeated the Vatsaraja of the Gurjara Prathihara Empire, and Dharmapala of the Pala Empire of Bengal (who was eager to rule Kannauj) in a battle in the Ganges - Yamuna doab. However, these great victories  brought him no permanent land gains but only a lot of material gain and fame. However another historian has claimed that Dhruva's empire stretched from Ayodhya in the north to Rameshvaram in the south.

Victories in the Deccan and South
He humbled Vishnuvardhana IV, an Eastern or Vengi Chalukyan king in 784 and forged an alliance by marrying his daughter named Silabhattarika as per the Jetvai grant of 786. Thereafter, he defeated Shivamara II, the Western Ganga Dynasty ruler of Gangavadi, and imprisoned him and appointed his own son, Prince Kambarasa as the governor. He also forced Pallava Nandivarman II to accept the suzerainty of Rashtrakuta who paid him handsomely with many elephants. He undertook campaigns to Kanchi in 785 and again against the Western Ganga Dynasty in 788.

Pan-India power
During his reign, Rashtrakutas emerged as a true pan-India power, controlling large regions across the Indian subcontinent. He was succeeded by his third son, Govinda III (793–814) whose reign was also marked by brilliant military success and exploits.

Notes

References

External links
 History of Karnataka, Mr. Arthikaje

793 deaths
History of Karnataka
Hindu monarchs
Rashtrakuta dynasty
8th-century Indian monarchs